The World Triathlon Duathlon Championships is a duathlon championship competition organised by World Triathlon. The race has been held annually since 1990. The championships involve a continuous run-cycle-run, with the format since 1994 being a first run of 10 km, a cycle of 40 km and a second run of 5 km (distances varied prior to 1994).

Champions

Elite

Venues

*The ITU Duathlon World Championships for Under23, Junior, Paraduathlon and Age-Group athletes took place in Ottawa, Canada, while Elite level competition occurred at the World Games 2013.

References

Duathlon competitions
Recurring sporting events established in 1990
Duathlon